The Kazakhstan Basketball Championship is the highest professional basketball league in Kazakhstan, it is organised by the National Basketball Federation Kazakhstan. Its official designation in full is: Basketball Championship of the Republic of Kazakhstan for men's teams (National league).

Kazakhstan is a member of FIBA Asia, as the country lies partly in Asia, and Kazakhstan Championship sides have played in its competitions such as the FIBA Asia Champions Cup, however the country also partly lies in Europe, and the league's teams have participated in FIBA Europe competitions such as the FIBA EuroChallenge and the FIBA Europe Cup as well. The league's clubs therefore are also eligible to, and often do compete in, Eastern European regional leagues such as the Baltic League and the VTB United League, which also operates as the top-tier national domestic league for Russia.

2015–16 teams

Champions

See also
Kazakhstan Basketball Cup - also organised by the National Basketball Federation Kazakhstan

Notes

References

External links
National Basketball Federation Kazakhstan league page 
League Page

 
Cham
Basketball leagues in Asia
Basketball leagues in Europe